The Torstenson war, Hannibal controversy or Hannibal War was a short period of conflict between Sweden and Denmark–Norway from 1643 to 1645 towards the end of the Thirty Years' War. The names refer to Swedish general Lennart Torstenson and Norwegian governor-general Hannibal Sehested.

Denmark had withdrawn from the Thirty Years' War in the Treaty of Lübeck (1629). After its victories in the war, Sweden felt it had to attack Denmark-Norway due to its advantageous geographical position in relation to Sweden. Sweden invaded in a short two-year war. In the Second Treaty of Brömsebro (1645), which concluded the war, Denmark-Norway had to make huge territorial concessions and exempt Sweden from the Sound Dues, de facto acknowledging the end of the Danish dominium maris baltici. Danish efforts to reverse this result in the Second Northern, Scanian and Great Northern wars failed.

Background
Sweden had been highly successful in the Thirty Years' War, having defeated Imperial armies in Germany and seen substantial victories under Gustavus Adolphus and after his death, under the leadership of Count Axel Oxenstierna, Lord High Chancellor of Sweden. At the same time, Sweden was continually threatened by Denmark–Norway, which almost completely encircled Sweden from the south (Blekinge, Scania and Halland), the west (Bohuslän) and the north-west (Jämtland). The Danish Sound Dues were also a continuing source of irritation and a contributing factor to the war. In the spring of 1643 the Swedish Privy Council determined that their military strength made territorial gains at the expense of Denmark-Norway likely. The Count drew up the plan for war and directed a surprise multi-front attack on Denmark in May.

Prelude
Swedish Field Marshal Lennart Torstensson was ordered to march against Denmark. Proceeding from Moravia, his forces entered Danish territory in Holstein on 12 December and by the end of January 1644 the Jutland peninsula was in his possession. In February 1644, the Swedish General Gustav Horn with an army of 11,000 men occupied much of the Danish provinces of Halland and Scania, except for the fortress town of Malmø.

War

Denmark
This attack caught Denmark-Norway unaware and poorly prepared but King Christian IV retained his presence of mind. He placed his confidence in the fleet to protect the home islands, just winning the Battle of Colberger Heide on 1 July 1644 but suffering a decisive defeat in the Battle of Fehmarn on 13 October 1644 against a Dutch–Swedish fleet. He also counted on the forces of Norway to relieve the pressures on Danish provinces in Scania by attacking Sweden along the Norwegian–Swedish border.

Norway
Norway, governed by Christian's son-in-law, Governor-General Hannibal Sehested, was a reluctant participant. The Norwegian populace opposed an attack on Sweden, which would only leave them open to counter-attack. Their opposition to Statholder Sehested's direction grew bitter and the war was lampooned as the "Hannibal War." The Danes cared little for Norwegian public sentiment when Denmark was threatened and Jacob Ulfeld initiated an attack into Sweden from Norwegian Jemtland. He was driven back and Swedish troops temporarily occupied Jemtland and advanced into the Norwegian Østerdal before being driven back.

Sehested had made preparations to advance with his own army and a similar army under Henrik Bjelke into Swedish Värmland but was ordered to relieve the King in the Danish attack on Gothenburg. When Sehested arrived the King joined his fleet and performed heroically, even though wounded, preventing Torstensson's army from moving onto the Danish islands. On the Norwegian front, Sehested attacked and destroyed the new Swedish city of Vänersborg. He also sent Norwegian troops under the command of George von Reichwein across the border from Vinger and Eidskog and troops under Henrik Bjelke into Swedish Dalsland.

Aftermath

Christian's Danish forces were so exhausted that he was forced to accept the mediation of France and the United Provinces in suing for peace. The Peace of Brömsebro was signed on 13 August 1645, a humiliating disaster to Denmark–Norway. The Swedes were exempted from the Sound Dues, the toll for passing through Danish territory into the Baltic Sea. Denmark–Norway ceded to Sweden the Norwegian provinces of Jemtland, Herjedalen and Idre & Serna and the strategically valuable Danish islands of Gotland (Valdemar Atterdag of Denmark had conquered the island from Sweden in 1361) in the center of the Baltic and Øsel in the Baltic Sea. In Dalarna the landshövding (chief of the land i.e. governor) raised a host of 200 dalecarlian farmers who seized the region of Särna, making it de facto Swedish territory. 
Sweden occupied the Danish province of Halland as well as other territories for 30 years as a guarantee of the treaty. The heir to the thrones of Denmark-Norway, Frederick II, Administrator of the Prince-Bishopric of Verden (1634–1645) and of the Prince-Archbishopric of Bremen (1635–1645), had to resign, with the two prince-bishoprics being occupied by the Swedes. According to the Peace of Westphalia both prince-bishoprics became a fief of the Holy Roman Empire to the Swedish crown in 1648.

Later events

The defeat of Denmark-Norway reversed the historic balance of power in the Baltic. Sweden gained domination of the Baltic, unrestricted access to the North Sea and was no longer encircled by Denmark–Norway. The surprise attack assured that Denmark–Norway now looked for an opportunity to recoup their losses, while Sweden looked for opportunities to expand further, setting the stage for continued conflict on the Baltic over the next century. With Denmark–Norway out of the war, Torstenson then pursued the Imperial army under Gallas from Jutland in Denmark south to Bohemia. At the Battle of Jankau near Prague, the Swedish army defeated the Imperial army under Gallas and could occupy Bohemian lands and threaten Prague, as well as Vienna.

References
History of the Norwegian People, by Knut Gjerset, The MacMillan Company, 1915, Volume II
Nordens Historie, by Hiels Bache, Forslagsbureauet, Kjøbenhavn, 1884.
Sweden and the Baltic, 1523–1721, by Andrina Stiles, Hodder & Stoughton, 1992 
The Struggle for Supremacy in the Baltic: 1600–1725, by Jill Lisk; Funk & Wagnalls, New York, 1967
The Northern Wars, 1558–1721 by Robert I. Frost; Longman, Harlow, England; 2000 

 
Thirty Years' War
Wars involving Denmark
Wars involving Sweden
Wars involving Norway
17th century in Sweden
17th century in Denmark
17th century in Norway
1643 in Sweden
1643 in Denmark
1643 in Norway
Conflicts in 1643
Conflicts in 1644
Conflicts in 1645
Denmark–Sweden relations
Christina, Queen of Sweden